Cinthia Knoth (born 18 August 1962) is a former Brazilian female sailor. She competed at the 1988 Summer Olympics representing Brazil in the Women's 470 event.

References

External links 
 
 

1962 births
Living people
Brazilian female sailors (sport)
Sailors at the 1988 Summer Olympics – 470
Olympic sailors of Brazil
Sportspeople from Rio de Janeiro (city)